Jacqueline Gottlieb is an American neuroscientist who is a professor of neuroscience and the Principal Investigator at the Columbia University Zuckerman Institute. Her research considers the mechanisms that underlie cognitive function.

Early life and education 
Gottileb was born in Israel. She moved to the United States for undergraduate studies at Massachusetts Institute of Technology, where she studied cognitive neuroscience. She moved to Yale University for doctoral research in neurobiology, and became fascinated by the frontal cortex. Gottileb used neural recordings to investigate frontal eye fields and smooth pursuit eye movements. Such movements are slow movements that are design to keep eyes fixed on an object that moves. After earning her doctorate, Gottileb moved to Uniformed Services University of the Health Sciences in Maryland, where she worked on in vitro slice recordings in the barrel cortex. She spent two years at the University of Health Sciences before joining the National Institutes of Health.

Research and career 
In 2001, Gottileb joined the faculty at Columbia University. She studies the fundamental mechanisms that underpin cognitive function, such as decision making and memory. She is interested in how the brain gathers evidence during everyday tasks and when people are curious, as well as disorders that reduce attention, such as depression and drug addiction. In 2019, she was made Director of the Research Cluster on Curiosity, which looks to examine the mechanisms and impacts of curiosity.

Awards and honors 
 2014 McKnight Foundation Memory and Cognitive Disorders Award 
 2015 The Center for Science & Society at Columbia University Presidential Scholars in Society and Neuroscience

Selected publications

References 

Year of birth missing (living people)
Living people
American neuroscientists
American women neuroscientists
Israeli emigrants to the United States
20th-century American scientists
20th-century American women scientists
21st-century American scientists
21st-century American women scientists
Massachusetts Institute of Technology alumni
Yale University alumni
Uniformed Services University of the Health Sciences faculty
National Institutes of Health people
Columbia University faculty